University College School, generally known as UCS, is an independent day school in Frognal, Hampstead, northwest London, England. The school was founded in 1830 by University College London and inherited many of that institution's progressive and secular views.

The UCS Hampstead Foundation is composed of four main entities:
 "The UCS Pre-Prep" (previously known as "The Phoenix"), currently co-educational (though from September 2017 new entry has been for boys only) for ages 4 to 7 on the Finchley Road site. This was acquired by UCS in 2003.
 "The Junior Branch", for boys aged 7 to 11 on the Holly Hill site in Hampstead.
 "The Senior School", for boys aged 11 to 16 and co-educational for ages 16 to 18 on the Frognal site, which is the largest school site. The main campus and the Great Hall are noted examples of Edwardian architecture. Inside the hall is a Walker pipe organ, used for school concerts, professional recordings and other festivities.
 "The Playing Fields" are situated in Ranulf Road in West Hampstead.

UCS is a member of the Eton Group of twelve independent schools and the Headmasters' and Headmistresses' Conference. It is known for its established bursary programme and music scholarships, as well as its outreach work with a number of other schools in North and West London, including Westminster Academy, the London Academy of Excellence and UCL Academy. It also has strong ties with the Equatorial College School in Uganda, and charitable work in Romania and India.

History 

University College School was founded in 1830 as part of University College London and moved to its current location in Hampstead in 1907. Continuing on the long tradition of dissenting academies, the University of London had been inspired by the work of Jeremy Bentham and others to provide opportunities for higher education regardless of religious beliefs.

At the time, only members of the established Church could study at Cambridge and Oxford (the only other two universities in England at the time) while similar religious tests were imposed at the other universities dating from the medieval and renaissance periods present in the rest of the British Isles, namely St Andrews, Glasgow, Aberdeen, Edinburgh and Dublin. Furthermore, the subjects taught at these Ancient Universities during this period, especially at Cambridge and Oxford, were relatively narrow, with classical subjects and divinity dominating.

Several of the founders of the University of London are directly associated with the founding of the school; they include Henry Brougham, 1st Baron Brougham and Vaux (who appears to be singled out as the ring leader in A tradition for Freedom), Lord Auckland (probably George Eden, 1st Earl of Auckland), William Bingham Baring, 2nd Baron Ashburton, Sir Isaac Lyon Goldsmid, Henry Hallam, Leonard Horner (The Royal Society of Edinburgh has described UCS as his 'monument'), James Mill, Viscount Sandon (probably either Dudley Ryder, 1st Earl of Harrowby or Dudley Ryder, 2nd Earl of Harrowby), James Lock, Stephen Lushington D.C.L. M.P., John Smith M.P., and Henry Waymouth.

The first headmaster was Henry Browne, who quickly caused controversy, by publishing a prospectus for the school which appeared to include some type of communal worship. This was replaced with a new version which also stated that the school would not use corporal punishment. The school opened at 16 Gower Street on 1 November 1830 under the name 'The London University School'. Browne soon resigned from his position and was replaced by John Walker (an assistant master). By February 1831 it had outgrown its quarters, in October 1831, the council of UCL agreed to formally take over the school and it was brought within the walls of the college in 1832, with a joint headmastership of Professors Thomas Hewitt Key and Henry Malden.

The school was original – it was never a boarding school, it was one of the first schools to teach modern languages, and sciences, and it was one of the first to abolish corporal punishment. Originally, there were no compulsory subjects and no rigid form system. Most boys learnt Latin and French, and many learnt German (a highly unusual subject to teach at that time). Mathematics, chemistry, Classical Greek and English were also taught. There was no religious teaching. Under the University College London (Transfer) Act 1905, University College London became part of the federal University of London, and the school was created as a separate corporation.

UCS moved away to new purpose-built buildings in Frognal in Hampstead in 1907, which were opened by Edward VII with the Archbishop of Canterbury in attendance on 27 July. Kikuchi Dairoku was invited to the first annual prize giving at Frognal where he represented those who had received their prizes at Gower Street. The new school buildings were designed by Arnold Mitchell and built by the Dove Brothers. The main school block has been Grade II listed on the National Heritage List for England since May 1974.

Prince Edward, Duke of Kent, opened the Sixth Form Centre (which also houses the Lund Theatre) in 1974. Elizabeth II visited the school in 1980 to celebrate its 150th anniversary and to inaugurate the rebuilt hall, which had been destroyed by fire in 1978. A new library, music school, lecture theatre, computer laboratory, sports hall, geography block, mathematics school and further classrooms were added to the senior school site in 1993 and the Junior Branch buildings were also refurbished, with the addition of an Art & Technology Centre.

In 2006 the Sir Roger Bannister Sports Centre was officially opened by Bannister (himself an Old Gower).

In 2007 a new art, design technology and modern languages building came into use and was formally opened as the Jeremy Bentham building by Prince Richard, Duke of Gloucester on 22 May 2008. In 2009, girls were admitted into the newly co-educational sixth form for the first time.

The playing fields, situated in West Hampstead, were upgraded between 2017 and 2019, with an overhauled drainage system and the building of a new pavilion, named the Kantor Centre. 2018 saw the opening of a newly refurbished library, known as the AKO Centre, replacing the older Enav Library.

Traditions 
The school motto is Paulatim Sed Firmiter ("Slowly but surely"). In 2016, the school updated its school logo to incorporate its widely known name of UCS Hampstead and to include the full motto in its roundel emblem. The school's colours are maroon and black which are shown on the school's vertically striped blazers and striped ties. UCS publishes a termly online newsletter called The Frognal and a yearly printed magazine called The Gower sent to current and past pupils.

The annual speech day and prize giving ceremony has been hosted by many speakers  including,

The senior school is divided into three sections by age, and each year has a name. Each section is led by a head of section.
 Lower school – entry (year 7) and shell (year 8)
 Middle school – lower remove (year 9), remove (year 10) and upper remove (year 11)
 Upper school – transitus (year 12) and sixth (year 13)

Pupils in the lower school are arranged into houses, each named after a bird. In the lower school, there is one form (class) per year in each house. The four houses are Kestrel (blue), Eagle (yellow), Hawk (black) and Falcon (green).

Pupils in the middle school and upper school are arranged into demes, each named after a former prominent member of staff. This is similar to a school house. In the middle school, there is one form (class) per year in each deme. In the upper school there are at three form groups per year for each deme. As well as a deme warden (housemaster/housemistress), each deme has deme captains (head of house). Deme, half, and full colours are awarded through an accumulation of academic and extra-curricular achievements. There are regular inter-deme competitions in sport, music, and drama throughout the year. In the middle school, the distinctive school blazer carries a coloured school logo on the breast pocket depicting the pupil's deme. There are currently six demes:
 Baxters – blue
 Black Hawkins – yellow
 Evans – black (pink badge) 
 Flooks – green
 Olders – silver
 Underwoods – purple

In the final year of school, a team of monitors (prefects) is selected. There are two captains of monitors (informally known as head boy and head girl), and two vice captains of monitors. A notable captain of monitors includes Hugh Dennis, who held this role in 1980.

The school song, Paulatim, is sung at the end of every term and the annual speech day and prize giving ceremony. This usually involves pupils throwing their hands in the air in sets of threes, to the phrase Paulatim, Paulatim, Paulatim. This tradition originated with the throwing of printed song sheets into the air.

Admissions 
There are five main points of entry for prospective pupils:

 Pre-prep, at age 4, by internal exam and assessment. As of 2019 the pre-prep no longer has a nursery section.
 Junior branch, at age 7, judged by a combination of internal exam and interview.  As of 2010, the junior branch no longer operates an 8+ entry point.
 Lower school, at age 11, judged by a combination of internal exam and interview.
 Middle school, at age 13, judged by a combination of internal exam and interview.
 Upper school, at age 16, judged by a cognitive ability exam and interviews. All offers are conditional upon GCSE results. This point of entry is available for girls as well as boys and each year; around 55 new girls are accepted into the school each year.

Old Gowers 

Former pupils are known as Old Gowers, which was derived from Gower Street where the school was founded. Notable Old Gowers include:

Thomas Ades – composer
Roger Bannister – athlete, first man to run the 4-minute mile
Dirk Bogarde – actor
Chris Bonington – mountaineer
William Hardwick Bradbury – printer and publisher 
Rob Buckman – doctor and medical writer
Bertie Carvel – actor and singer
Gordon Corera – BBC security correspondent
Joseph Chamberlain – Leader of the Opposition, Late Victorian and Edwardian-era politician
Paul Dacre – editor of the Daily Mail
Hugh Dennis – comedian and writer
Horace Field – architect
Daniel Finkelstein – The Times executive editor, journalist
Ford Madox Ford – novelist
Jonathan Freedland – writer and journalist
Alex Garland – author and screenwriter
William Court Gulley, 1st Viscount Selby – Speaker of the House of Commons
Bernard Hart – psychiatrist (1945)
Tristram Hunt – historian and former Labour MP
Oliver Hart – economist, awarded the Nobel Memorial Prize in Economic Sciences in 2016
Leonard Huxley – author and teacher
Rufus Isaacs – Viceroy of India, Lord Chief Justice of England, and Foreign Secretary
Ian Katz – BBC Newsnight editor
Joseph Kerman - musicologist
Edward Levy-Lawson – editor of the Daily Telegraph
Colin Marshall, Baron Marshall of Knightsbridge – businessman, Former CEO of British Airways
Ernest William Moir – civil engineer
David McCallum – actor, Ilya Kuryakin, Man from UNCLE
Max Minghella – actor
David Patrikarakos – author and journalist
Karl Pearson – mathematician, inventor of statistical methods
Sir Roger Penrose – mathematical physicist, awarded the Nobel Prize in Physics in 2020
Daniel Roche – actor
Herbert Samuel – leader of the Liberal Party, Home Secretary and High Commissioner for Palestine
Philippe Sands – author and human rights lawyer
Will Self – writer and TV presenter
Joseph Horovitz – composer and conductor
Stephen Spender – poet
Mark Turin – anthropologist and linguist
Sir Julius Vogel – former New Zealand Premier
Dan Wagner – internet entrepreneur
Julian Lloyd Webber – musician
Geoffrey Wheatcroft – journalist and writer
Maurice Cornforth - Marxist philosopher

Notable staff 

Notable former staff include:
 Alexander William Williamson; according to A Tradition for Freedom he taught pupils at the school.
 Augustus De Morgan, distinguished mathematician. First professor of mathematics, University College London; according to the British Society for the History of Mathematics, taught pupils when the distinctions between the school and college were somewhat blurred. Believed to have taught James Joseph Sylvester. Was the first president of the London Mathematical Society. The De Morgan Medal is named in his honour. It has been awarded to at least one Old Gower – Sir Roger Penrose.
 Carey Foster, professor of physics at University College London
G. S. Carr, according to the British Society for the History of Mathematics
 Henry Malden, headmaster
 John Williams, taught at UCS post World War II, first Master of Music at St Peter ad Vincula, Tower of London, which was then a royal chapel. Professor at the Royal College of Music. Honorary fellow of the Royal College of Music and Fellow of the Royal Society of Arts
 Sir William Smith, lexicographer and teacher
 Henry Browne, headmaster
 Thomas Archer Hirst, teacher 1860–1864. Nominated and admitted to the Royal Society whilst teaching at UCS. Later, professor of physics, University College London
 Thomas Hewitt Key, headmaster
 Kenneth Durham, headmaster. Chairman of the Headmasters' and Headmistresses' Conference 2011–2012

Further reading 

 A Tradition for Freedom The Story of University College School by Nigel Watson, James and James (Publishers) Ltd 2007.
 An angel without wings: The history of University College School 1830–1980 by H. J. K. Usher, C. D. Black-Hawkins and G. J. Carrick, edited by G. G. H. Page (University College School, 1981).
 University College School Register for 1860–1931 : with a short history of the school by Stanley Leathes, with an introduction by S. N. Carvalho (Published 1931)
 From Gower Street to Frognal: a short history of University College School from 1830 to 1907 by F. W. Felkin,  (Published Arnold Fairbairns 1909)
 University College School Register, 1901–63 compiled by N. Holland (Published 1964)
 University College School Register for 1831–1891 edited by Temple Augustus Orme, (published H. W. Lawrence [1892?])
 University College School Roll of Honour and War List 1914–18 compiled by Charles Roadnight Cockman and Cyril Leonard Ross Thomas, (published St. Albans Campfield Press 1922)
 On the Japanese connection with UCS see Japanese Students at Cambridge University in the Meiji Era, 1868–1912: Pioneers for the Modernization of Japan, by Noboru Koyama, translated by Ian Ruxton, (Lulu Press, September 2004).

References

External links 
 
 University College London
 Profile at the Good Schools Guide 
 Beyond Words Festival website
 School's grief for teacher killed in train tragedy

1830 establishments in England
Educational institutions established in 1830
Frognal
Grade II listed buildings in the London Borough of Camden
Grade II listed educational buildings
History of University College London
Private boys' schools in London
Private co-educational schools in London
Private schools in the London Borough of Camden
Member schools of the Headmasters' and Headmistresses' Conference

Schools in Hampstead
University-affiliated secondary schools